William Frederick Harris (March 6, 1918 – December 7, 1950) was a United States Marine Corps (USMC) lieutenant colonel during the Korean War. The son of USMC General Field Harris, he was a prisoner of war during World War II and a recipient of the Navy Cross for extraordinary heroism during the breakout in the Battle of Chosin Reservoir. He was last seen by American forces on December 7, 1950, was listed missing in action and is presumed to have been killed in action. Harris was featured in the book and film Unbroken.

Biography 
William Frederick Harris was born on March 6, 1918, at Good Samaritan Hospital in Lexington, Kentucky, to Field Harris (1895–1967) and Katherine Chinn-Harris (1899–1990).

Harris graduated from the United States Naval Academy, Annapolis, Maryland, in the class of 1939. He was in A Company, 1st Battalion, 4th Marines and was captured by Japanese forces during the Battle of Corregidor in May 1942.

He escaped with Edgar Whitcomb, future governor of Indiana, and on May 22, 1942, swam  hours across Manila Bay to Bataan, where he joined Filipino guerrillas fighting Japan just after the Battle of Bataan. In the summer of 1942, Harris and two others left Whitcomb and attempted to sail to China in a motorboat, but the engine failed and the boat drifted for 29 days with little food or water. The monsoon blew them back to an island in the southern part of the Philippines where they split up and he joined another resistance group.

Harris was taken to Ōfuna POW camp, arriving February 13, 1944 and became acquainted with Louis Zamperini. Harris experienced malnutrition and brutal treatment at the hands of his jailers, notably by Sueharu Kitamura (later convicted of war crimes). In September and November 1944, Harris was beaten severely, to the point of unconsciousness, by Kitamura. According to fellow captive, Pappy Boyington, Harris was knocked down 20 times with a baseball bat for reading a newspaper stolen from the trash. Harris was near death when he arrived at a POW camp near Ōmori in early 1945. Zamperini provided Harris with additional rations and he recovered. William Harris was chosen to represent prisoners of war during the surrender of Japan, aboard  on September 2, 1945.

After World War II, Harris remained in the Marines. He married Jeanne Lejeune Glennon in 1946 and had two daughters.

He was recalled to active duty during the Korean War. He was the commanding officer of Third Battalion, Seventh Marines, First Marine Division (Reinforced) in the Korean War. During the breakout in the Battle of Chosin Reservoir, his unit stayed behind as a rear guard to protect retreating forces. Despite heavy losses, Harris rallied his troops and personally went into harm's way during the battle. Harris was last seen by American forces on December 7, 1950, walking and carrying two rifles on his shoulders. He was listed as missing in action, but after the war when former POWs had neither seen nor heard of him, Harris was declared to be dead. He was awarded the Navy Cross in 1951 for his actions at Chosin. Because of his penchant for escape and survival exhibited during World War II, his peers and family were reluctant to accept his death. A superior officer held on to his Navy Cross for a number of years, expecting to be able to give it to Harris personally.

Remains thought to be his were eventually recovered and interred at Pisgah Presbyterian Church Cemetery, Versailles, Kentucky. His family doubted the remains were his, and conclusive testing using DNA had not been attempted as of 2014.

Awards 

For his leadership and heroism on December 7, 1950, Harris was awarded the Navy Cross.

Harris also received the Purple Heart, the Prisoner of War Medal, the Combat Action Ribbon, the Korean Service Medal, the United Nations Service Medal, the National Defense Service Medal, the Republic of Korea Presidential Unit Citation, the Korean War Service Medal and the World War II Victory Medal.

See also 
List of Navy Cross recipients for the Korean War

References

External links 
 
 
 

1918 births
1950 deaths
United States Marine Corps colonels
United States Marine Corps personnel of World War II
American prisoners of war in World War II
World War II prisoners of war held by Japan
United States Marine Corps personnel of the Korean War
American military personnel killed in the Korean War
Recipients of the Navy Cross (United States)
United States Naval Academy alumni
Military personnel from Lexington, Kentucky
Military personnel missing in action